The Italian Union of Textile Workers (UILT) was a trade union representing workers in the textile industry in Italy.

The union was founded in 1950 and held its first conference in 1953.  It affiliated to the Italian Union of Labour.  By 1965, the union had 48,161 members.  In 1969, it merged with the Italian Union of Clothing Workers, to form the Italian Union of Textile and Clothing Workers.

References

Textile and clothing trade unions
Trade unions in Italy
Trade unions established in 1950
Trade unions disestablished in 1969